The order Cathartiformes  of raptors or birds of prey includes the New World vultures and the now-extinct Teratornithidae. These raptors are classified by most taxonomic authorities in the order Accipitriformes (which includes the eagles and hawks). In the past, they were considered to be a sister group to the storks of the order Ciconiiformes based on DNA–DNA hybridization and morphology. However, a 2021 analysis of mitochondrial genes among Accipitrimorphae, which include Cathartiformes, reinforced prior findings on the phylogenetic relationships between Cathartiformes and other subfamilies of Accipitriformes.

Cathartiformes, also known as New World vultures, possess unique adaptations in their plumulaceous feathers that prevent the accumulation of bacteria and fungal spores, allowing them to feed on carrion without getting sick. These feather adaptations include a lack of aftershaft, a flattened shape, and a porous structure that allows air to flow through, preventing the retention of moisture and bacteria. Their feathers lack the interlocking hooks found in other bird feathers, making them more flexible and allowing for a greater degree of movement. This flexibility may aid in their ability to maintain body temperature while soaring at high altitudes and navigating through turbulent air currents. Additionally, the presence of feather pulp and melanin pigment in these feathers may contribute to their durability and resistance to wear and tear. These feather characteristics are distinct to Cathartiformes and likely play an important role in their unique ecological niche as scavengers. Additionally, New World vultures have a highly acidic digestive system that allows them to break down and destroy harmful pathogens in their food.

References

Eocene birds
Eocene animals of North America
Eocene animals of South America
Paleogene birds of North America
Paleogene birds of South America
Neogene birds of North America
Neogene birds of South America
Quaternary birds of North America
Quaternary birds of South America
Extant Eocene first appearances